Karin Moe (born 3 December 1945) is a Norwegian writer and literary critic.

She made her literary debut in 1980 with the text collection Kjønnskrift. Other collections are 39 Fyk from 1983, and Sjanger from 1986. She published the experimental novels Blove 1. bok and Blove 2. bok  in 1990 and 1993 respectively. Moe was part of the poetic activist group "Stuntpoetene" during the 1980s, along with Jón Sveinbjørn Jónsson, Triztán Vindtorn, Arne Ruste, Thorvald Steen, Erling Kittelsen, Torgeir Rebolledo Pedersen and others.

She was awarded Mads Wiel Nygaards Endowment in 1990.

References

1945 births
Living people
People from Skien
Norwegian women critics
Norwegian literary critics
Women literary critics
Norwegian women non-fiction writers
20th-century Norwegian novelists
Dobloug Prize winners